Samir Aghayev (born 25 May 2002) is an Azerbaijani footballer who plays as a midfielder for Zira in the Azerbaijan Premier League.

Club career
On 12 August 2022, Aghayev made his debut in the Azerbaijan Premier League for Zira against Sabah.

References

External links
 

2002 births
Living people
Association football midfielders
Azerbaijani footballers
Azerbaijan youth international footballers
Azerbaijan Premier League players
Zira FK players